Afghanistan participated in the 2004 Summer Paralympics in Athens, Greece. It was reportedly the country's first "official" appearance at the Paralympic Games, although two cyclists had already competed for Afghanistan in 1996. The delegation consisted of two competitors, Mareena Karim and Qaher Hazrat. A third competitor, runner Sharifa Ahmadi, was registered for the games but did not participate.

Sports

Athletics

Women's track

Cycling

See also
Afghanistan at the Paralympics
Afghanistan at the 2004 Summer Olympics

External links
International Paralympic Committee

References 

Nations at the 2004 Summer Paralympics
2004
Summer Paralympics